Krishna Rao or Krishnarao is an Indian full name based on the given name Krishna and the surname Rao.

 A. N. Krishna Rao (1908–1971), one of the well-known writers in Kannada language
 Bhavaraju Venkata Krishna Rao (born 1930), Indian cricketer
 Dronamraju Krishna Rao (born 1937), Indian geneticist
 K. V. Krishna Rao (1923-2016), former Chief of Indian army and a former Governor of Jammu & Kashmir, Nagaland, Manipur and Tripura
  Dr. A. Krishna Rao, (1924 -2020) Retired Dean of the Kasturba Medical College, Manipal
 Mandali Venkata Krishna Rao (1926–1997), Indian politician
 U. Krishna Rao (died 1961), former Indian politician of the Indian National Congress and Member of the Legislative Assembly of Madras state
 Krishna Rao (director), film/television director and cinematographer  
 Dr. Krishna Rao Voomaji Rao Ghorpade, better known as Dr. K. V. Ghorpade an eminent Indian Pathologist.
 Krishna Rao (administrator) (died 1857), acting Diwan of Travancore
 Krishna Rao (archeologist) (born 1930), Indian archeologist and writer
 Krishnarao Jaisim, Indian architect
 Krishna Rao (journalist), Indian journalist and political analyst
 Shamsher Bahadur I (Krishna Rao), Maratha noble

See also
 Krishna (disambiguation)
 Rao (disambiguation)